Our Leading Citizen is a 1939 American comedy film directed by Alfred Santell and written by Jack Moffitt. The film stars Bob Burns, Susan Hayward, Joseph Allen, Elizabeth Patterson, Gene Lockhart and Charles Bickford. The film was released on August 23, 1939, by Paramount Pictures.

Plot

Cast  
Bob Burns as Lem Schofield
Susan Hayward as Judith Schofield
Joseph Allen as Clay Clinton
Elizabeth Patterson as Aunt Tillie
Gene Lockhart as J.T. Tapley
Charles Bickford as Shep Muir
Otto Hoffman as Mr. Stoney
Clarence Kolb as Jim Hanna
Paul Guilfoyle as Jerry Peters
Fay Helm as Tonia
Kathleen Lockhart as Mrs. Barker
Hattie Noel as Druscilla
Kathryn Sheldon as Miss Swan
Monte Blue as Frank
Jim Kelso as Chief of Police
Harry C. Bradley as Director
Frances Morris as Maid
Thomas Louden as Frederick the Butler
Olaf Hytten as Charles
Phil Dunham as Janitor
Gus Glassmire as Doctor

References

External links 
 

1939 films
1930s English-language films
Paramount Pictures films
American comedy films
1939 comedy films
Films directed by Alfred Santell
American black-and-white films
1930s American films